Sugar Ridge Township is one of eleven townships in Clay County, Indiana. As of the 2010 census, its population was 939 and it contained 449 housing units.

History
Sugar Ridge Township organized in 1854. It was named from a high ridge passing through its central portion.

The Aqueduct Bridge, Feeder Dam Bridge, and Jeffers Bridge are listed on the National Register of Historic Places.

Geography
Dietz Lake is in this township.

Cities and towns
 Center Point

Unincorporated towns
 Ashboro
 Saline City
(This list is based on USGS data and may include former settlements.)

Adjacent townships
 Jackson Township (north)
 Washington Township (east)
 Marion Township, Owen County (southeast)
 Harrison Township (south)
 Perry Township (west)
 Posey Township (northwest)

Major highways
  Indiana State Road 46
  Indiana State Road 59

Cemeteries
The township contains three cemeteries: Gremes, Harris and Moss.

References
 United States Census Bureau cartographic boundary files
 U.S. Board on Geographic Names

External links

 Indiana Township Association
 United Township Association of Indiana

Townships in Clay County, Indiana
Terre Haute metropolitan area
Townships in Indiana
1854 establishments in Indiana